Crazy Rich Asians is a 2018 American romantic comedy-drama film directed by Jon M. Chu from a screenplay by Peter Chiarelli and Adele Lim. The film was accompanied by both a soundtrack album (with contributions from various artists) and an original motion picture score album (composed by Brian Tyler). The film stars Constance Wu, Henry Golding, Gemma Chan, Awkwafina, Nico Santos, Lisa Lu, Ken Jeong, and Michelle Yeoh and follows a young Asian-American woman who travels to meet her boyfriend's family and is surprised when she discovers they are among the richest in Singapore.

Crazy Rich Asians was released in the United States on August 15, 2018, by Warner Bros. Pictures and August 23, 2018, internationally. It is noted as the first film in the modern setting by a major Hollywood studio to feature a majority Asian cast since 1993's The Joy Luck Club. The film has grossed over $238 million worldwide and received positive reviews from critics, who praised the performances and the production design. A sequel is in development.

Background
During the film's production process, director Jon M. Chu and music supervisor Gabe Hilfer assembled a list of hundreds of songs about money, including songs by Kanye West ("Gold Digger"), Hall & Oates ("Rich Girl"), the Notorious B.I.G. ("Mo Money Mo Problems"), Lady Gaga ("Money Honey"), and Barrett Strong ("Money (That's What I Want)"). Seeking to create a multilingual soundtrack, Chu and Hilfer compiled Chinese songs from the 1950s and 1960s by Ge Lan (Grace Chang) and Yao Lee, as well as contemporary songs, and then searched through YouTube videos for singers fluent in Mandarin Chinese to provide cover versions of songs.

Two versions of "Money (That's What I Want)" were performed—one in English and one in Chinese—by Malaysian singer Cheryl K, who had originally auditioned for the film singing "Mamma Knows Best" by Jessie J. Awkwafina, who is also a rapper, contributed a few verses to the end credits version but recorded her parts in a separate studio. The soundtrack includes a Chinese cover of "I Want You to Be My Baby" performed by Ge, and another version performed by Chinese jazz singer Jasmine Chen, who was also featured in the film. A choreographed dance number accompanied the song but was ultimately cut for the theatrical release.

"My New Swag" is a collaboration with Chinese rappers VaVa and Ty., both of whom competed on The Rap of China. Taiwanese-Hong Kong singer Sally Yeh had previously recorded a Cantonese cover of Madonna's "Material Girl"; since Madonna was not one of its songwriters, the artist's permission was not required for the song's inclusion. To accompany the film's wedding scene, a cover of Elvis Presley's "Can't Help Falling in Love" was rerecorded for the film by Japanese–American singer and YouTuber Kina Grannis.

A Chinese cover of Coldplay's 2000 song "Yellow" plays over the final scenes of Crazy Rich Asians. Coldplay was initially hesitant about the song's use in the movie. Since Chu was unsatisfied with using other songs like "Stay" by Rihanna and songs by Sia in its place, he wrote a passionate letter directed to the members of the band to convince them to allow the song to be used in the film, speaking to his relationship with the word 
"yellow" as an Asian-American  and his hope to reappropriate the term in the last scene of the movie. The request was approved in less than 24 hours. After Li Wenqi, a Chinese singer from the third season of The Voice of China, declined to reprise her cover of the song from the competition series (which had been used by Hilfer in test screenings), "Yellow" was eventually recorded by Katherine Ho, who competed on the tenth season of The Voice (US). "Vote" is an original song by Miguel, produced by Mark Ronson and Hudson Mohawke.

The film's soundtrack album and score album, by Brian Tyler, were both released on August 10, 2018, through WaterTower Music.

Track listings

Charts

References

External links 
 Official website
 
 
 

2018 soundtrack albums
Asian-American mass media
WaterTower Music soundtracks
Brian Tyler soundtracks
Comedy film soundtracks
Drama film soundtracks
Romance film soundtracks